Events in the year 1974 in Cyprus.

Incumbents

Events 
Ongoing – Cyprus dispute

 20 July – The Turkish invasion of Cyprus was launched.

Deaths

References 

 
1970s in Cyprus
Years of the 20th century in Cyprus
Cyprus
Cyprus
Cyprus